Sham Shui Po is an area of Kowloon, Hong Kong, situated in the northwestern part of the Kowloon Peninsula, north of Tai Kok Tsui, east of Cheung Sha Wan and south of Shek Kip Mei. It is located in and is the namesake of the Sham Shui Po District.

A predominately lower-income neighborhood, Sham Shui Po is one of the densest and most vibrant neighbourhoods in Hong Kong. It has a diverse mix of migrants from rural China, working-class families and seniors, with many living in cage homes, subdivided flats and public housing estates. Sham Shui Po has many lively street markets, electronics outlets, fabric stores, restaurants and food vendors. It is famous for Golden Computer Shopping Arcade for bargain electronics and accessories.

History
The discovery in 1955 of the Lei Cheng Uk Han Tomb indicates that as early as 2000 years ago there were Chinese people settled in what is now Sham Shui Po. Sham Shui Po means "Deep Water Pier" in Cantonese. At the time, the water in Sham Shui Po was deeper than the beach of Cheung Sha Wan to the northwest. It is close to the former peninsula of Tai Kok Tsui, the low ridge of which ends in Sham Shui Po.

At the time of the 1911 census, the population of Sham Shui Po was 1,577. The number of males was 1,028.

In the first stage, the town of Sham Shui Po was bounded by Yen Chow Street, Tung Chau Street, Wong Chuk Street, and Apliu Street. Part of the town was on reclamation land. A nullah along Nam Cheong Street was constructed to drain the water of rivers to the north and east (which explains the street's wideness). The town was closed to Cosmopolitan Dock on the outer shore of Tai Kok Tsui.

Under Japanese occupation, a concentration camp was maintained here for most of the duration of the Second World War. An account of life by a British POW has been published as The Hard Way: Surviving Shamshuipo POW Camp 1941–45 by Victor Stanley Ebbage (Spellmount, 2011).

Land use
As Sham Shui Po was one of the earliest developed areas in Hong Kong, it was once a commercial, industrial and transportation hub of the territory. Factories and warehouses are still concentrated mainly in Cheung Sha Wan.

It is connected to the MTR rail network via the Sham Shui Po station on the Tsuen Wan line.

Cityscape

Urban renewal

Sham Shui Po is an area where urban decay is serious in Hong Kong. The government is carrying out urban renewal projects.

In July 2003 the Hong Kong Housing Society (HKHS) announced that its first urban renewal project would be to improve the living environment at Po On Road/Wai Wai Road in Sham Shui Po. Government, institutional and community facilities will also be erected for the community. This development will require the HKHS to acquire about 157 properties, costing an estimated HK$240 million. The total development cost of the project is about HK$720 million. To promote creative tourism in old Hong Kong districts of Wan Chai and Sham Shui Po Hong Kong Design Centre unveiled a budget of $60 Million.

Shopping

The street market in Sham Shui Po is a hotspot for both locals and tourists.

The Apliu Street market is well known in Hong Kong for its electronics. The vendors in this open-air street market sell a wide variety of products at reasonable prices, allowing individuals to trade second-hand goods here. Different shops sell a variety of goods including industrial electronics, analogue and digital radio communications equipment, disco effects equipment, crockery, 1940s-era radios, LPs, torches, and audiophile hi-fi amplifiers in various stages of repair. The Hong Kong government promotes Apliu Street as Hong Kong's answer to Akihabara (in Japan).

Golden Computer Centre is one of the major malls selling computer-related equipment (see next section).

The annual Hong Kong computer fair held in the streets of Sham Shui Po attracts a large crowd.

The market on Ki Lung Street is also famous for its fresh food and cheap prices. In the early 1990s, the Hong Kong government rebuilt the market and also added air conditioning.

There are numerous fashionwear wholesalers along Cheung Sha Wan Road. On weekends, some shops allow retail purchases, offering quality clothes at very affordable prices.

Nam Cheong Street and Ki Lung Street are most famous for their fabric stores, containing cloth, sash, ribbons and buttons.

Golden Shopping Centre

Once infamous for counterfeit software but today considered one of the cheapest places in Hong Kong to purchase a personal computer, the Golden Shopping Centre is a prominent IT shopping centre. Products range from complete systems, cell phones, to various peripherals. Unlike purely consumer-oriented IT shopping centres, Golden features several stores specializing in professional and esoteric network equipment.

The Golden Shopping Centre is also known for the number of video game stores it contains, where people purchase gaming systems, software and accessories at either a slightly discounted price, or in special in-store packages which might include an extra game or extra accessories. Since the halls are extremely narrow, it is often very congested, especially on weekends. The mall has two floors. The upper floor, Golden Computer Centre, mainly sells games and gaming software, while the lower floor, Golden Computer Arcade, focuses on the sales of computer-oriented hardware. They were originally fashion markets named "Golden Shopping Centre" and "Golden Shopping Arcade" respectively.

Influence on Hong Kong's Internet culture

In late 1990s, when the Internet started becoming popular, the shop owners of the Golden Computer Centre launched a website to post the prices of computer hardware and software. Later, a forum known as HKGoldenw as set up on the website, which later became one of the largest Internet forums in Hong Kong.

Dragon Centre

Dragon Centre is a nine-storey shopping centre. It was the largest shopping centre in West Kowloon until Elements opened its doors above the Kowloon MTR station.

Local Delicacies 
As Sham Shui Po is usually regarded as one of the poorest and oldest districts in Hong Kong, it is well known for people to find cheap and local food in Sham Shui Po. A lot of local restaurants are located in Fuk Wa Street, Fuk Wing Street, Pei Ho Street and Kweilin Street. Some of the famous restaurants include Kung Wo Beancurd Factory, Wai Kee Noodle Cafe, Man Kee Cart Noodle and Kwan Kee Store, which are highly praised for their soy milk and pudding, pork liver noodles, cart noodles and traditional puddings respectively. Some of these unique restaurants are also starred by Michelin and recommended in its list.

Streets

Streets and roads in Sham Shui Po include:
 Apliu Street
 Boundary Street
 Castle Peak Road
 Cheung Sha Wan Road
 Fuk Wa Street – street market with numerous stalls selling varieties of goods like old books and clothes. It spans from Castle Peak Road to Tai Po Road. Unlike the names of streets nearby, it does not follow the place names in China. Its name means blessing (fuk) and prosperous (wa).
 Fuk Wing Street – Unlike the names of streets nearby, it does not follow the place names in China. Its name means blessing and glorious.
 Ki Lung Street
 Lai Chi Kok Road
 Nam Cheong Street
 Pei Ho Street
 Tai Po Road
 Tonkin Street
 Yen Chow Street
Un Chau Street

Historic buildings

 Lei Cheng Uk Han Tomb
 Lui Seng Chun
 North Kowloon Magistracy. In 2008, the building was part of the seven buildings of Batch I of the Hong Kong Government's Revitalising Historic Buildings Through Partnership Scheme seeking adaptive reuse of government-owned historic buildings. This building was used by the Savannah College of Art and Design (SCAD) as its Hong Kong campus from 2010 until 2020.
 Sam Tai Tsz Temple and Pak Tai Temple Complex
Sham Shui Po Police Station
Ex-Sham Shui Po Service Reservoir

Education 
The district is home to several prestigious schools, including 
 San Wui Commercial Society YMCA of Hong Kong Christian School
 St. Francis of Assisi's English Primary School
 St. Margaret's Co-educational English Secondary and Primary School
 Tsung Tsin Primary School And Kindergarten, among others.

Sham Shui Po is in Primary One Admission (POA) School Net 40. Within the school net are multiple aided schools (operated independently but funded with government money) and two government schools: Fuk Wing Street Government Primary School and Li Cheng Uk Government Primary School.

Other facilities
Lei Cheng Uk Swimming Pool
Precious Blood Hospital (Caritas)
 Nam Cheong Park
 Sham Shui Po Park
 Sham Shui Po Park Swimming Pool
 Shek Kip Mei Park
 Tung Chau Street Park
 Public housing estates in Sham Shui Po
 Yen Chow Street Hawker Bazaar

Notable people
Ladies World Snooker champion Ng On-yee grew up in the area, and learned the game at her father's snooker hall there.

See also
 List of buildings, sites and areas in Hong Kong
 Sham Shui Po Barracks

References

External links 
 

 
New Kowloon